Santiago Moreno (born 21 April 2000) is a Colombian professional footballer who plays as a winger for Major League Soccer club Portland Timbers.

Career

Portland Timbers
On 29 July 2021, Moreno signed with MLS side Portland Timbers on a contract until 2025.

On 4 December 2021, Moreno scored for the Timbers against MLS side Real Salt Lake in the 2021 MLS Cup Playoffs to help send the Timbers to the MLS Cup Final.

Career statistics

Club

Notes

References

2000 births
Living people
Colombian footballers
Colombia international footballers
Association football midfielders
Categoría Primera A players
América de Cali footballers
Footballers from Cali
Portland Timbers players
Major League Soccer players